The Swedish Agency for Accessible Media (MTM), formerly the Audiobook and Braille Library (TPB), is a Swedish governmental administrative agency under the Ministry of Culture.

The agency's task is to work in collaboration with other libraries in the country to ensure that everyone has access to literature and social information based on their own abilities, regardless of reading ability or disability, and to make easy-read literature available. For example, the agency must ensure that people with reading and writing difficulties/dyslexia and visual impairments have access to literature in media adapted for them: audiobooks, Braille books, tactile picture books and e-books. All audiobooks are made in DAISY format. DAISY stands for Digital Accessible Information System and is an open, internationally established standard. In addition to cooperation with other area libraries on lending accessible media, the agency also has its own program to lend Braille books. It is also working on developing technology for media for people with reading disabilities.

The available books and newspapers are downloaded from the agency's digital library Legimus. In March 2016, there were over 100,000 audiobooks, more than 18,000 Braille titles, around 3,000 e-books and 150 books in sign language.

The agency is located in Bylgiahuset in Malmö and has operated there since 1 January 2020.

History 
A Braille library was established in Stockholm in 1892 by Amy Segerstedt, director of Tysta skolan (lit. 'the Silent School'), a private school for the deaf. It moved into the same building as the Swedish Association of the Blind in 1895 and was taken over by the association in 1912.

The Swedish Association of the Blind began lending audiobooks in 1955.

The Audiobook and Braille Library became an authority in 1980. When the agency was established, all books were transferred from the Swedish Association of the Visually Impaired to the agency, which thus became the lending center for audiobooks and braille books.

One of the reasons for the name change was that its assignment has been broadened from audiobooks and Braille books to include other accessible media.

Publications 
Since 2015, MTM has taken over the state's responsibility for publishing and distributing easy-to-read literature and making easy-to-read news information available through the publication of the easy-to-read news magazine .

Nordic cooperation 
MTM cooperates with similar agencies in the Nordic countries: the Norwegian Library of Talking Books and Braille, Nota in Denmark,  in Finland; and the Icelandic . An agreement was signed in 2009 which allows accessible literature to be shared between these countries. The agreement increases user access and also eliminates unnecessary duplication of work in creating accessible versions.

MTM's awards 
The  award is presented to a reading ambassador or narrator (for recordings) who has made outstanding efforts to promote reading in the care sector.  recognizes organizations or institutions that do an excellent job of enabling people with reading difficulties or disabilities to read on their own terms.

Current awards

('Reading Gold') is MTM's accessibility award, presented to an individual or organization that has made an exciting or progressive contribution to accessible media during the year. Formerly known as the Amy Award, it is named after Amy Segerstedt, who founded the Association for Braille in 1892, a direct predecessor of MTM.

Recipients 
 2018 – The  ('youth reading for the elderly') project by Helena Pennlöv Smedberg and Laven Fathi at Gottsunda Library in Uppsala
 2019 – The Sustainable Poetry project in Trelleborg, project leader Maria Glawe
 2020 – Eva Fridh and Martin von Knorring for a cookbook for the visually-impaired

The  award ('Reading Ambassador of the Year Award') is presented to a reading ambassador or narrator for efforts to promote reading in care for disabled or elderly people.

Recipients 
2012 – Marie Schelander, Härryda
 2013 – Barbro Granberg and Helena Oskarsson, Piteå
 2014 – Ann Erixson, Halmstad
 2015 – Susanne Sandberg, Skövde
 2016 – Ingrid Jonsson, Lidköping
 2017 – Ingeborg Albrecht, Ystad
 2018 – Bitte Sahlström, Östhammar
 2019 – Agneta Json Granemalm, Ljungby
2020 – Sebastian Åkesson

Previous awards

Amy Award 
The Amy Award was MTM's accessibility award, presented to an individual or organization that made an exciting or progressive contribution to accessible media during the year. In 2018, the Amy Award and the Best Easy-Reading Library Award were merged to form .

Recipients 
 2010 – Minabibliotek.se, six libraries in the Umeå region
 2011 – Komvux Kärnan in Helsingborg
 2012 – Heidi Carlsson Asplund, librarian and project manager
 2013 – Anna Fahlbeck, librarian, Linköping library
 2014 – Anne Ljungdahl, school library developer, Västerås
 2015 – Jenny Edvardsson, teacher at Wendesgymnasiet, Kristianstad
 2016 – Göteborg University Library's reading service
 2017 – no award

Best Easy-Reading Library 
The prize was awarded to a library that recognized the need for easy reading among several target groups and actively worked with marketing and well-planned information about easy reading.

Recipients 
 2009 – Norrköping Library
 2010 – Sundbyberg Library
 2011 – Strängnäs Library
 2012 – Mjölby Library
 2013 – Värnamo Library and Gävle Library
 2014 – Halmstads Library
 2015 – Linköpings Library
 2016 – Tumba Library
 2017 – no award

See also 
 Scandinavian Braille

References

External links 
 The Swedish Agency for Accessible Media 

Library-related organizations
Accessibility
Government agencies of Sweden
Libraries for the blind
Deaf culture in Sweden